John Miers may refer to:

John Miers (artist) (1756–1821), British artist
John Miers (botanist) (1789–1879), British botanist

See also
John Myers (disambiguation)